Kuixi Town is an urban town in Anhua County, Hunan Province, People's Republic of China.

Administrative division
The town is divided into 12 villages and 1 community, the following areas: Baiyang Community, Yongxing Village, Kuixiping Village, Yanhuai Village, Jiaotang Village, Chenjiazhuang Village, Laowuxi Village, Huangshaxi Village, Lujiatian Village, Muliu Village, Yinxuan Village, Wuhan Village, and Xinlong Village (白羊社区、永兴村、奎溪坪村、言槐村、角塘村、陈家庄村、老屋溪村、黄沙溪村、卢家田村、木榴村、银玄村、雾寒村、新龙村).

References

External links

Divisions of Anhua County